"Get Me" is a song by Canadian singer Justin Bieber, featuring vocals from American singer Kehlani. It was released on January 28, 2020, as the sole promotional single from Bieber's fifth studio album, Changes. Bieber and Kehlani wrote the song alongside producers Poo Bear, Boi-1da, Vinylz, and CVRE, while it was also additionally produced by Jahaan Sweet.

Background
On January 3, 2020, the same day that Bieber released the lead single of Changes, "Yummy", TMZ reported through an article that Kehlani was one of the featured artists to appear on the album. "Get Me" was released the same day that Bieber announced the album. The song was also played on his docu-series, Justin Bieber: Seasons (2020).

Composition
"Get Me" is a mid-tempo pop and R&B love ballad that employs "nocturnal" moombahton beats and a "ha, ha, ha"-filled chorus. According to the sheet music published at Musicnotes.com by Universal Music Publishing Group, the song is composed in  time and the key of C♯ minor with a tempo of 109 beats per minute. The verses follow a Gm7–Cm9–Fm7 sequence. Musically, the track encompasses "a soulful, stripped back sound" with sparse production that features Fender Rhodes washes, DJ scratches, and a simple bass-and-percussion bed occasionally enhanced by touches of electric piano. Stereogums Tom Breihan wrote that the song draws from 1990s R&B and "Drake-style architectural moodiness". Bieber and Kehlani's vocals, described as "soft" and "velvety" by Sara Delgado of Teen Vogue, share smooth tones and are pushed to the forefront of the track. The two go back and forth on the "smooth and sexy" duet, with Kehlani adding soulful harmonies and lead lines to the song, while Bieber contributes some vocal flourishes toward the end.

Credits and personnel
Credits adapted from Tidal.

 Justin Bieber – lead vocals, songwriting
 Kehlani – featured vocals, songwriting
 Poo Bear – production, songwriting
 Boi-1da – production, songwriting
 Vinylz – production, songwriting
 CVRE – production, songwriting, background vocals
 Jahaan Sweet – additional production
 Josh Gudwin – mixing, recording
 Chris "TEK" O'Ryan – recording

Charts

References

2020s ballads
2020 songs
Contemporary R&B ballads
Justin Bieber songs
Kehlani songs
Pop ballads
Songs written by Boi-1da
Songs written by Justin Bieber
Songs written by Kehlani
Songs written by Poo Bear
Songs written by Vinylz
Song recordings produced by Boi-1da
Song recordings produced by Vinylz